Ilasaros (centuryBCE) or Il Sharih Yahdhib was a king from the Bakil tribe, related to the Banu Hamdan, which took control over the Kingdom of Sabaʾ. He reigned between c. 60-20 BCE during a period of turmoil. His rule was contemporary with a rival tribe led by Sha'r Awtar.

Name
Ilasaros is Strabo's Greek transliteration of the Sabaean name Il Sharih, meaning "the gods' victor". In the case of Hadramaut, the most important god of their pantheon was usually Sayin.

Yahdhib meant "suppressor", i.e. of rebellions or usurpation.

Life
Ilasaros led many successful expeditions against the neighbouring kingdoms of Ḥimyar and Hadhramaut. Moreover, he managed to subjugate rebels in the north and to take their children as captives and slaves to his Ghumdan Palace.

In the year 25 BCE, the Roman Prefect Aelius Gallus started an expedition to Arabia Felix under the orders of Augustus against Saba'. However, the expedition ended in failure and the Romans accused a Nabataean guide by the name of Syllaeus of misleading them. This expedition was mentioned by Greek geographer Strabo in which he named Ilasaros as the ruler of Hadhramaut at that time.

See also
List of rulers of Saba and Himyar

References

History of Yemen
Middle Eastern kings
1st-century BC Yemeni people